Al Henderson (born 24 September 1950) is a retired Trinidad soccer forward who played two seasons in the North American Soccer League.

Henderson was born in Trinidad, the son of a soccer referee who taught Henderson the sport. Henderson went to England at age nine, spending three years there and continuing his athletic development. He then returned to Trinidad, attending high school at St Mary's College. While playing in Trinidad, Henderson was noticed by Howard University coach Lincoln "Tiger" Phillips, who recommended the university recruit him. Henderson thus attended Howard, where he was a 1970 and 1971 first team All American and a 1972 second team All American.  He was inducted into the Howard University Hall of Fame in 1998.  In 1974, Henderson signed with the Baltimore Comets of the North American Soccer League (NASL).  He spent two seasons with the Comets.

He has served as the Trinidad Minister of Sport.

References

External links
 NASL Stats

1950 births
Howard Bison men's soccer players
Trinidad and Tobago footballers
Trinidad and Tobago expatriate footballers
North American Soccer League (1968–1984) indoor players
North American Soccer League (1968–1984) players
Baltimore Comets players
Living people
All-American men's college soccer players
Association football forwards
NCAA Division I Men's Soccer Tournament Most Outstanding Player winners